Lawrence "Larry" Huber (born May 6, 1946) is an American television producer, writer, and animator who is known for his long history as a producer at Hanna-Barbera, Ruby-Spears, and Nickelodeon. Huber began his animation career in 1969 while working on Hanna-Barbera's The Perils of Penelope Pitstop. He went on to work for Ruby-Spears for 15 years. Returning to Hanna-Barbera in 1990, Huber worked on 2 Stupid Dogs and Fish Police. He was hired by Buzz Potamkin to supervise production on Cartoon Network's World Premiere Toons in 1995.

Huber left Hanna-Barbera in 1996 following the company's merger with Turner Broadcasting. Along with Bill Burnett, Huber co-created and executive produced an Oh Yeah! Cartoons pilot on Nickelodeon, which would later air as ChalkZone as a full series. Huber continued his role in animation on Random! Cartoons and Adventure Time, created by Pendleton Ward originally for Nickelodeon and later greenlit by Cartoon Network, which premiered in 2010.

Animotion Works, a company founded by Huber, was launched in 2004 in Burbank, California. The company has produce the Danger Rangers series for PBS.

Career
Huber began working in animation in 1969 as an assistant to Hanna-Barbera on The Perils of Penelope Pitstop. He later left Hanna-Barbera to work for Ruby-Spears, a job he held for 15 years.

Huber returned to Hanna-Barbera in 1990 to work on 2 Stupid Dogs and the short-lived series Fish Police. He was soon hired by producer Buzz Potamkin to supervise production on Fred Seibert's then-upcoming World Premiere Toons shorts program (later named What a Cartoon!) on Cartoon Network. The series consisted of 48 animated shorts and spawned new creator-driven original programming for the network, including Dexter's Laboratory (the show paid homage to Huber, naming the titular character's school as Huber Elementary), Cow and Chicken, Johnny Bravo, I Am Weasel, The Powerpuff Girls, and Courage the Cowardly Dog.

After Turner Broadcasting merged with Time Warner in October 1996, Huber left Hanna-Barbera once again to become an executive producer on Seibert's other animated shorts showcase, Oh Yeah! Cartoons, on Nickelodeon. Huber's ChalkZone short from Oh Yeah! Cartoons, which he co-created with Bill Burnett, was picked up by Nickelodeon for a full series. It premiered on March 22, 2002, with the highest ratings for a new show premiere in the network's history at the time. He continued to work with big idea cartoon incubators, consulting on Seibert's Random! Cartoons, which spawned Eric Robles' Fanboy & Chum Chum (in which he also directed the voice actors), Adventure Time by Pendleton Ward and Ward's Bravest Warriors. (He continues to be involved with Bravest Warriors as a consultant to show runner Breehn Burns and as an animation director).

In 2004 Huber launched his own production company called Animotion Works, located in Burbank, California. The company has since produced the educational children's television series Danger Rangers for PBS, which ran from September 3, 2005, to December 26, 2006.

Personal life
Huber has a Bachelor of Fine Arts degree in Cinemagraphics from the Chouinard Art Institute (now the California Institute of the Arts), which he obtained from 1964 to 1968.

Filmography

Accolades

References

External links
 
 

American male screenwriters
American television producers
American television writers
American male television writers
Living people
California Institute of the Arts alumni
1946 births
Hanna-Barbera people
Nickelodeon Animation Studio people
Showrunners
American animators
American animated film producers
American voice directors
American storyboard artists